The 2014 Virginia Cavaliers men's soccer team was the college's 74th season of playing organized men's college soccer, and their 62nd season playing in the Atlantic Coast Conference.

After a mediocre season in ACC conference play and a quarterfinal exit from the ACC Men's Soccer Tournament, the Cavaliers made a deep run into the 2014 NCAA Division I Men's Soccer Championship where they ended up winning their seventh national title, defeating UCLA in penalty kicks.

Roster

Schedule

See also 

 Virginia Cavaliers men's soccer
 2014 Atlantic Coast Conference men's soccer season
 2014 NCAA Division I men's soccer season
 2014 ACC Men's Soccer Tournament
 2014 NCAA Division I Men's Soccer Championship

References 

Virginia Cavaliers
Virginia Cavaliers men's soccer seasons
Virginia Cavaliers men's soccer
Virginia Cavaliers
NCAA Division I Men's Soccer Tournament-winning seasons
NCAA Division I Men's Soccer Tournament College Cup seasons
Virginia Cavaliers